The 1969 Stockholm Open was a tennis tournament played on hard courts in Stockholm, Sweden. The tournament was held from November 1 through November 7, 1969. Roy Emerson and Rod Laver won in the final 6–4, 6–2 against Andrés Gimeno and Graham Stilwell.

Draw

Main draw

References

Stockholm Open